Zoë Charlton (born 1973) is an American contemporary artist and fully tenured Professor of Art and Director of Graduate Studies at George Mason University.

Biography 

Charlton was born at Eglin Air Force Base, Florida in 1973. She obtained a Bachelor of Arts degree in painting and drawing from Florida State University and went on to receive a Master of Arts degree from the University of Texas at Austin. She has participated in residencies at Ucross Foundation (WY, 2019), Artpace (TX, 2018), the Skowhegan School of Painting and Sculpture (ME, 2001)  and at The Patterson Residency for the Creative Alliance (MD, 2003).  Charlton also participated in the Drawing Center's Viewing (NY) program from 2001 to 2003.

Charlton's work has been included in national and international group exhibitions including the Zacheta National Gallery of Art (Warsaw, Poland), Haas & Fischer Gallery (Zurich, Switzerland), the Contemporary Arts Museum Houston, the Studio Museum in Harlem (NYC, NY), Clementine Gallery (NYC, NY) and Wendy Cooper Gallery (Chicago, IL).

Collections 
Works by Charlton are in the collections of the Crystal Bridges Museum of American Art, the Herbert F. Johnson Museum of Art, The Phillips Collection,  the Rose Art Museum and the Birmingham Museum of Art.

References

External links
 The Phillips Collects: Zoë Charlton

1973 births
Living people
20th-century American women artists
21st-century American women artists
African-American contemporary artists
American contemporary artists
Artists from Florida
Florida State University alumni
People from Tallahassee, Florida
University of Texas at Austin alumni
20th-century African-American women
20th-century African-American people
20th-century African-American artists
21st-century African-American women
21st-century African-American artists
Skowhegan School of Painting and Sculpture alumni